Raymond Guyot (November 17, 1903 - April 17, 1986) was a French politician, leader of the French Communist Party. 

Guyot was born in Auxerre. He joined the party in 1921, and was elected a member of its Central Committee seven years later. From 1935 to 1943 he was a high-ranking member of the Presidium of the Communist International for Youth and was general secretary of the Executive Committee for a period.

He was a member of the Politbureau of the Communist Party of France from 1945 to 1972. He was also deputy to the National Assembly from 1937–40 and 1946–58, and was made a senator in 1959. He died in Paris, aged 82.

References

French Communist Party politicians
1903 births
1986 deaths
People from Auxerre
Senators of Seine (department)
Senators of Paris
People granted political asylum in the Soviet Union
French expatriates in the Soviet Union